Patricia Norris (March 22, 1931 – February 20, 2015) was an American costume designer and production designer, who worked on many significant American films and was nominated for six Academy Awards in her career.

Career
Norris's first credit as costume designer was for The Late Liz (1971). She went on to design costumes for several iconic films of the 1970s and 1980s, including Capricorn One (1977), Days of Heaven (1978), Victor/Victoria (1982) and Scarface (1983). In 1980, she designed the costumes for The Elephant Man, the first of many collaborations with director David Lynch. For her next project with Lynch, Blue Velvet, she received her first credit as production designer, taking responsibility for the entirety of the film's decor, not just the costumes. Norris continued to work on all of Lynch's films, up to The Straight Story (1999). In later years, Norris collaborated with Plan B Entertainment on The Assassination of Jesse James by the Coward Robert Ford (2007), Killing Them Softly (2012), and 12 Years a Slave (2013).

Awards
She was nominated six times for the Academy Award for Best Costume Design: for Days of Heaven, The Elephant Man, Victor/Victoria, 2010: The Year We Make Contact, Sunset and 12 Years a Slave. She won the Emmy Award for Outstanding Costume Design for a Series for the pilot episode of Twin Peaks. Norris won the Costume Designers Guild Period Film Award for 12 Years a Slave (2013).

In 2010, she received a Lifetime Achievement Award from the Art Directors Guild. She was the only person to receive Lifetime Achievement Awards from both the Costume Designers Guild and the Art Directors Guild.

References

1931 births
2015 deaths
Emmy Award winners
American costume designers
Women costume designers
American production designers
Place of birth missing
Women production designers